The NBC sitcom Family Ties aired from September 22, 1982 to May 14, 1989 with a total of 176 episodes produced.

Series overview

Episodes

Season 1 (1982–83)
This is the only season where Michael Gross is clean shaven.

Season 2 (1983–84)

Season 3 (1984–85)

Film (1985)
The television film Family Ties Vacation aired two nights before the start of season four. The movie was later split into four individual episodes when the series entered syndication.

Season 4 (1985–86)

Season 5 (1986–87)

Season 6 (1987–88)

Season 7 (1988–89)

References

External links
 

Lists of American sitcom episodes